Opuntia microdasys (angel's-wings, bunny ears cactus, bunny cactus or polka-dot cactus) is a species of flowering plant in the cactus family Cactaceae, native and endemic to central and northern Mexico.

Description
Opuntia microdasys forms a dense shrub 40–60 cm tall, occasionally more, composed of pad-like stems 6–15 cm long and 4–12 cm broad.

Instead of spines it has numerous white or yellow glochids 2–3 mm long in dense clusters. They are barbed and thinner than the finest human hairs, detaching in large numbers upon the slightest touch. If not removed they will cause considerable skin irritation so the plants must be treated with caution.
 
The Latin specific epithet microdasys means “small and hairy”.

The yellow flowers appear only rarely. Despite this, it is a very popular cactus in cultivation, partly because of the young plant’s comical resemblance to a rabbit’s head. It has gained the Royal Horticultural Society’s Award of Garden Merit.

Distribution
Native to Mexico, naturalised in Kenya, Malawi, and Tanzania. One reason for the success of O. microdasys in desert habitats - at home and as an introduction - is its efficient fog collection ability. The spines and hairs have the perfect structure and microstructure to capture and channel fog.

Related species
The very closely related Opuntia rufida differs in having reddish-brown glochids. It occurs further north in northern Mexico, and into western Texas. Some botanists treat the two as a single species.

Species comparison gallery

References

External links

microdasys
Cacti of Mexico
Endemic flora of Mexico
Flora of Hidalgo (state)
Garden plants of North America
Flora of Sicily